Steve Sylvester (born March 4, 1953 in Cincinnati, Ohio) is a former American football offensive lineman who played nine seasons in the National Football League for the Oakland/Los Angeles Raiders.  He played college football for the University of Notre Dame.

External links
NFL.com player page

1953 births
Living people
Players of American football from Cincinnati
American football offensive guards
American football centers
Notre Dame Fighting Irish football players
Oakland Raiders players
Los Angeles Raiders players